CBRE Group, Inc. is an American commercial real estate services and investment firm. The abbreviation CBRE stands for Coldwell Banker Richard Ellis. It is the world's largest commercial real estate services and investment firm (based on 2021 revenue).

The firm is ranked 122nd on the Fortune 500 and has been included in the Fortune 500 every year since 2008. CBRE serves more than 90 of the top 100 companies on the Fortune 100. It is one of the "Big 4" commercial real estate services companies, alongside Cushman & Wakefield, Colliers, and JLL.

Services
CBRE provides services to both occupiers of and investors in real estate:
 For occupiers, CBRE provide facilities management, project management, transaction (both property sales and leasing) and consulting services and valuation among others. 
 For investors, CBRE provide capital markets (property sales, commercial mortgage brokerage, loan origination and servicing), property leasing, investment management, property management, valuation and development services, among others.

History

 In 1906, Tucker, Lynch & Coldwell, the earliest predecessor to CBRE, established the company.
 In 1913, the company added Benjamin Arthur Banker as partner and changed its name to Coldwell, Cornwall & Banker in 1920. Cornwall resigned as partner in 1940, and the company name changed again to Coldwell, Banker & Co, which was eventually shortened to Coldwell Banker.
 In 1981, Coldwell Banker was acquired by Sears.
 In 1989, Sears sold Coldwell Banker's commercial unit to a management-led buyout group including The Carlyle Group for approximately $300 million. After the buyout, the company was renamed CB Commercial Real Estate Group. The residential group retained the Coldwell Banker name.
 In 1996, the company became a public company via an initial public offering, raising approximately $80 million.
 In 1997, the company acquired Koll Real Estate Services for $145 million.
 In 1998, CB Commercial merged with Richard Ellis International (REI) Limited and changed its name to CB Richard Ellis (CBRE).
 In 2001, CBRE was acquired in a leveraged buyout by an investment group led by Blum Capital for $800 million.
 In 2003, the company acquired Insignia Financial Group for $415 million.
 In 2004, CBRE once again became a public company via an initial public offering.
 In 2006, the company's shares were added to the S&P 500 Index.
 In 2006, the company acquired Trammell Crow Company for $2.2 billion.
 In 2011, the company acquired the real estate investment business of ING Group for $940 million.
 In 2011, the company changed its name to CBRE Group Inc.
 In 2013, the company acquired Norland Managed Services, a facilities, energy and project management provider in the United Kingdom and Ireland.
 In 2015, the company acquired Global Workplace Solutions from Johnson Controls.
 In 2018, the company acquired FacilitySource.
 In 2019, the company acquired the London developer Telford Homes.
 In 2020, the company headquarters were relocated from Los Angeles to Dallas, Texas.
 In 2021, CBRE Group Inc paid $960 million for a 60% stake in the UK multidisciplinary professional services firm Turner & Townsend.

See also

 Newmark Group
 JLL
 Cushman & Wakefield
 Colliers
 Commercial Real Estate

References

External links

 

2004 initial public offerings
Commercial real estate companies
Companies based in Dallas
American companies established in 1906
Real estate companies established in 1906
Companies listed on the New York Stock Exchange
Property services companies of the United Kingdom
Real estate services companies of the United States